Megachile rhinoceros is a species of bee belonging to the mason bee family. M. rhinoceros was described by Alexander Mocsáry in 1892.

References

Rhinoceros
Insects described in 1892